Body Music is the debut studio album by English electronic music duo AlunaGeorge. It was released on 26 July 2013 by Island Records. The album was supported by four singles: "You Know You Like It", "Your Drums, Your Love", "Attracting Flies" and "Best Be Believing". The album debuted at number 11 on the UK Albums Chart, selling 7,690 copies in its first week. As of September 2016, Body Music had sold 32,137 copies in the United Kingdom.

Singles
"You Know You Like It" was released as the album's lead single on 19 April 2012 by Tri Angle. When reissued on 28 July 2013, by Island Records, the single reached number 39 on the UK Singles Chart.

"Your Drums, Your Love" was released as the second single from the album on 10 September 2012, reaching number 50 on the UK Singles Chart.

The album's third single, "Attracting Flies", was released on 8 March 2013, peaking at number 17 on the UK Singles Chart.

"Best Be Believing" was released on 8 November 2013 as the album's fourth and final single.

Critical reception

The album was met with positive reviews from contemporary music critics. The album holds a score of 73/100 on review aggregate website Metacritic, indicating "generally favorable reviews."

Track listing

Notes
 The UK and German physical deluxe edition switch tracks 17 and 18.

Personnel
Credits adapted from the liner notes of the deluxe edition of Body Music.

AlunaGeorge
 Aluna Francis – vocals ; production 
 George Reid – production ; mixing ; reportage

Additional personnel

 Ben Ashton – set design
 Chris Carmouche – mixing 
 Sam Farr – additional engineering 
 Fiona Garden – cover art, photography
 Serban Ghenea – mixing 
 John Hanes – mix engineering 
 Stuart Hawkes – mastering 
 Adam Pickard – additional engineering 
 Mark Rankin – mixing 
 Stars Redmond – reportage
 Beau Thomas – mastering
 James Trood – additional instrumentation

Charts

Release history

References

2013 debut albums
AlunaGeorge albums
Island Records albums
Vagrant Records albums